Mads Andersen may refer to:

 Mads Andersen (chess player) (born 1995), Danish chess grandmaster
 Mads Andersen (poker player) (born 1970), Danish poker and backgammon player
 Mads Andersen (rower) (born 1978), Danish lightweight rower
 Mads Hamberg Andersen (born 1983), Danish footballer
 Mads Juel Andersen (born 1997), Danish footballer